Niphona paraparallela is a species of beetle in the family Cerambycidae. It was described by Stephan von Breuning in 1979. It is known from Vietnam.

References

paraparallela
Beetles described in 1979